Swiss Unihockey, formerly Schweizer Unihockey Verband, is a sports association which is representing floorball in Switzerland.

The Swiss Floorball Association organizes the Unihockey Prime League, the National League B and several regional leagues.

History 
The Swiss floorball association was founded April 20, 1985 in Sarnen. In 1986 the Swedish, Finnish and Swiss floorball decided to found the International Floorball Federation.

Facts 
Number of licensed players

Total: 30791
 Men: 11622
 Women: 3557
 Men Under 19: 13073
 Women Under 19: 2539
Number of Floorball Clubs: 417

Participation and results in IFF events

IFF events organized by the association

References 

National members of the International Floorball Federation
Floorball
Floorball in Switzerland
Floorball governing bodies
1985 establishments in Switzerland